Tammiku is a village in Väike-Maarja Parish, Lääne-Viru County, in northeastern Estonia. Prior to the 2017 administrative reform of Estonian local governments, the village was part of Rakke Parish.

References

 

Villages in Lääne-Viru County
Kreis Wierland